John Young (1624–1665) was a minister of the Church of Scotland who was elected Bishop of Argyll.

Life

He was born in 1624 in western Scotland. Little is known of Young but he was elected Professor of Divinity in place of Rev Robert Baillie in October 1652 and took on the role in November. He was created Dean of Faculty in June 1653. In 1665 he was elected Bishop of Argyll in place of David Fletcher but died before his consecration.

Family

He married twice: firstly Barbara Roberton, secondly (around 1660) Marion Campbell (1637-1669) daughter of Colin Campbell of Blythswood.

References
 

1624 births
1665 deaths
Academics of the University of Glasgow
Scottish bishops